Fiesta en la Azotea: En Vivo Desde El Auditorio Nacional (English: Party on the Roof: Live From the National Auditorium) is a live DVD performance by recording artist Belinda. It was recorded at El Auditorio Nacional in Mexico City. The DVD features a full-length concert in which she performs her greatest hits like "Lo Siento" and "Ángel", as well as past hits from novelas like "¡Amigos X Siempre!", "Aventuras En El Tiempo" and "Cómplices Al Rescate", as well as footage of her celebrating her fifteenth birthday, an important rite of passage in Mexican culture.

Track listings

Music videos (Bonus)

Karaoke (Bonus) 

 Includes a behind-the-scenes look at the tour, concert, and her fifteenth birthday in 2004.

Certification

References 

Belinda Peregrín video albums
2005 video albums
2005 live albums
2005 compilation albums
Music video compilation albums
Live video albums